The Detroit Tigers' 1992 season was a season in American baseball. It involved the Detroit Tigers attempting to win the American League East.

Offseason
 December 20, 1991: Dan Gladden was signed as a free agent by the Tigers.
 January 15, 1992: Jorge Velandia was signed as an amateur free agent by the Tigers.
Before 1992 Season: Steve Carter was signed as a free agent with the Detroit Tigers.

Regular season
 Cecil Fielder was left off the All Star team despite leading the league in RBIs at the midway point. At season's end, Fielder wound up third to Juan González and Mark McGwire in the American League home run chase. His 124 RBIs made him the first American Leaguer since Babe Ruth to lead the majors in runs batted in for three consecutive seasons.
 On September 25, Sparky Anderson tied Hughie Jennings for most wins as Tigers manager (1,131 wins). He became the team's most successful manager two days later, with a 13-3 victory over the Cleveland Indians.

Opening Day lineup
LF Dan Gladden
2B Lou Whitaker
SS Alan Trammell
1B Cecil Fielder
C Mickey Tettleton
DH Tony Phillips
RF Rob Deer
3B Travis Fryman
CF Milt Cuyler

Season standings

Record vs. opponents

Notable transactions
 June 1, 1992: Frank Catalanotto was drafted by the Tigers in the 10th round of the 1992 Major League Baseball Draft. Player signed June 2, 1992.

Roster

Player stats

Batting

Starters by position 
Note: Pos = Position; G = Games played; AB = At bats; H = Hits; Avg. = Batting average; HR = Home runs; RBI = Runs batted in

Other batters 
Note: G = Games played; AB = At bats; H = Hits; Avg. = Batting average; HR = Home runs; RBI = Runs batted in

Pitching

Starting pitchers 
Note: G = Games pitched; IP = Innings pitched; W = Wins; L = Losses; ERA = Earned run average; SO = Strikeouts

Other pitchers 
Note: G = Games pitched; IP = Innings pitched; W = Wins; L = Losses; ERA = Earned run average; SO = Strikeouts

Relief pitchers 
Note: G = Games pitched; W = Wins; L = Losses; SV = Saves; ERA = Earned run average; SO = Strikeouts

Farm system

LEAGUE CHAMPIONS: Lakeland

Notes

References

1992 Detroit Tigers season at Baseball Reference
Tigers at Baseball Almanac

Detroit Tigers seasons
Detroit Tigers season
Detroit Tigers
1992 in Detroit